"Chaand Baaliyan" is a song by Indian singer-songwriter Aditya A. The song has charted No 1 on Apple Music and iTunes Chart in India. It was also ranking on 45th position on YouTube Charts in India. As of April 2022 "Chaand Baaliyan" was a trending song on Instagram Reels as well. Aditya has released the song in the year 2019, which went viral two years after its release.

Popularity
The song started gaining more reach when Bollywood celebrities started making Instagram Reels on the song. 
Alia Bhatt & Bhavin Bhanushali made the reel on it which has 2.6+ millions hits on it.
Siddhant Chaturvedi made reel on the song as well.
 Dutch singer Emma Heesters covered the song which has over half a million hits on YouTube.

References

2019 songs
Indian songs